Raffaele Pisu (24 May 1925 – 31 July 2019) was an Italian actor and comedian.

Life and career 
Born in Bologna as Guerrino Pisu into a family of Sardinian origin, Pisu debuted in the drama theater and in 1945 he was one of the founders of the stage company L'attico. He later focused on the avanspettacolo, working with the Nava Sisters, Isa Barzizza and Wanda Osiris. He reached a large popularity with several variety shows on radio and later on television, notably with the variety television L'amico del giaguaro (1961–1964). Pisu was also active in TV-movies and in films, usually in supporting roles.

In 2005, Pisu won the Nastro d'Argento for best supporting actor for his performance in Paolo Sorrentino's The Consequences of Love.

References

External links 

1925 births
2019 deaths
Actors from Bologna
Italian male stage actors
Nastro d'Argento winners
Italian male film actors
Italian male comedians
Italian male television actors
20th-century Italian male actors